The men's 100 metres T34 took place in Stadium Australia.

There were no preliminary rounds; only a final round was held. The T34 is for athletes who have cerebral palsy or similar disabilities and use a wheelchair.

Final round

References

Athletics at the 2000 Summer Paralympics